The 2004 Cork Junior A Hurling Championship was the 107th staging of the Cork Junior A Hurling Championship since its establishment by the Cork County Board in 1895. The championship began on 17 October 2004 on 14 November 2004.

On 14 November 2004, Ballygarvan won the championship following a 3-7 to 1-12 defeat of Grenagh in the final. This was their first championship title in the grade.

Ballygarvan's Liam Dillon was the championship's top scorer with 1-33.

Qualification

Results

First round

Semi-finals

Final

Championship statistics

Top scorers

Overall

In a single game

Miscellaneous

 Ballygiblin qualified for the championship for the very first time in their history.

References

Cork Junior Hurling Championship
Cork Junior Hurling Championship